The Lightship Finngrundet is a lightvessel built in 1903 and now a museum ship moored in Stockholm, Sweden.

History
She was the second Finngrundet lightvessel, built in Gävle, Sweden in 1903 and replacing one dating from 1859.

She was extensively modified in a refit in 1927 at Öregrunds Ship och Varvs AB, the original paraffin light being replaced with an AGA beacon. The fog bell was augmented with a "nautophone" fog signal and an underwater fog signal.

Further modifications carried out in 1940 included the addition of wireless communication along with equipment for her to function as a weather station, and the electrification of her light.

Her final refit was in 1957 when the deckhouse and crew space were modified.

The optics were built by G.W. Lyth of Stockholm. Two flashes were produced every 20 seconds (1 second on, 3.5 seconds off, 1 second on and 14.5 seconds off).

She was replaced in 1969 by an unmanned caisson lighthouse and became a museum ship attached to the Vasa Museum.

References

External links

 Lightships (partly in German)
 Vasa museum
 Internet public library

 

Museum ships in Sweden
Ships of Sweden
Lightships
Museums in Stockholm
Ships built in Sweden